David O'Hare and Joe Salisbury won the title , defeating Austin Krajicek and Nicholas Monroe in the final 6–1 , 6–4 .

Seeds

Draw

Draw

References
 Main Draw
 Qualifying Draw

JSM Challenger of Champaign-Urbana
JSM Challenger of Champaign–Urbana